Julian Arthur Charles Haviland (born 8 June 1930) is a British print and broadcasting journalist of over sixty years' standing. He was a lobby correspondent at Westminster for over twenty years, and is the former Political Editor of Independent Television News (1975–81) and The Times newspaper (1981–86). He is also the author of two books.

Early life and education
Haviland was born on 8 June 1930, in the village of Iver Heath in Iver in Buckinghamshire. He is the son of Major Leonard Proby Haviland of the 6th Duke of Connaught's Own Lancers and Military Secretary to the Governor-General of New Zealand, and Helen Dorothea Fergusson, the daughter of General Sir Charles and Lady Alice Fergusson. Haviland was educated at Eton College, a boarding independent school in the town of Eton (near Windsor) in Berkshire in South East England, followed by Magdalene College, Cambridge.

Life and career
After leaving university, Haviland joined the Surrey Advertiser and worked as a reporter. He then joined the Johannesburg Star in South Africa as a reporter, where he learned to speak Afrikaans, returning to the UK in 1959. He then joined The Daily Telegraph in London and was then a reporter for the London Evening Standard.

In 1961, Haviland joined Independent Television News as a reporter and occasional newscaster. He became ITN's Political Correspondent in 1965, and in 1975 its Political Editor. He reported on the devaluation crisis facing Harold Wilson, the election of Edward Heath and the three-day week, and the subsequent return of Wilson to power. He was the first person to interview Margaret Thatcher on her victory in the Conservative Party leadership contest on 11 February 1975. He also interviewed James Callaghan when he became Prime Minister a year later. Haviland contrasted his attitude to political reporting with that of ITN's then News Editor, Don Horobin, thus: "(for him) it was the Daily Mail that set ITN's agenda. My view was that at ITN we must be at least as responsible and accurate as the BBC, without being so damned boring". Known for his personal kindness off-screen, his television reporting was crisp, well-expressed and fair, and he had a gift for explaining complicated issues succinctly. He was also known on-screen for wearing a plain jersey below the jacket rather than the more formal attire of a waistcoat.

Haviland was a member of the 1975 Houghton Committee, and co-wrote the minority report which persuaded Parliament not to introduce the state funding of political parties, as had been advocated by some members and suggested by others inside and outside Westminster.

In 1981, Haviland joined The Times as Political Editor, reporting on the early problems facing Thatcher's first government. He decided to retire from daily print journalism in 1986, the year of the Wapping dispute between the newspaper's proprietor and the print unions. He moved to Tomintianda, on the banks of Loch Tummel in Strathtummel in the Scottish Highlands, where he wrote two books and occasionally contributed to national political debate. He attended a political reunion of ITN's past and present Political Editors in 2011, to bid farewell to a colleague of many years' standing, and the following year, the funeral of his former ITN colleague, David Walter.

Family
Haviland married Caroline Victoria Barbour, daughter of George Freeland Barbour, in September 1959. He has three sons: Peter, Charles and Richard.

Publications

References

Alumni of Magdalene College, Cambridge
English television journalists
English television presenters
ITN newsreaders and journalists
Living people
People educated at Eton College
1930 births